Les Plus Grands Succès De Chic: Chic's Greatest Hits, also known as The Best of Chic, is a greatest hits album by the American R&B band Chic, released on Atlantic Records in late 1979. It includes the biggest hits from their first three albums: Chic (1977), C'est Chic (1978) and Risqué (1979).

The seven-track album, which omits the 1979 hit single "My Forbidden Lover" and replaces it with "Chic Cheer" and also combines three 7-inch edits and one extended 12-inch mix with three album versions, was the only compilation to be released during the band's six years on Atlantic. It reached #88 on the US charts and #30 in the UK in early 1980. Non-US editions dropped "Chic Cheer" for "My Forbidden Lover". The compilation was the first time that the 12" mix of "Everybody Dance" was made generally available, having previously been issued only as a promotion.

Track listing
All tracks produced and written by Bernard Edwards and Nile Rodgers, except "Dance, Dance, Dance (Yowsah, Yowsah, Yowsah)" co-written by Kenny Lehman.

Personnel

 Alfa Anderson - lead vocals (A1, A2, B2)
 Luci Martin - lead vocals (B2, B3)
 Norma Jean Wright - lead vocals (A4)
 Bernard Edwards - lead vocals (B3), bass guitar
 Nile Rodgers - guitar, vocals
 Tony Thompson - drums
 Fonzi Thornton - vocals
 Michelle Cobbs - vocals
 Ulland McCullough - vocals
 Luther Vandross - vocals
 David Lasley - vocals
 Robin Clark - vocals
 Diva Gray - lead vocals (A1)
 Sammy Figueroa - percussion
 Robert Sabino - keyboards, clavinet, acoustic piano and electric piano
 Andy Schwartz - keyboards, clavinet, acoustic and electric piano
 Raymond Jones - keyboards
 Robert Sabino - keyboards, Fender Rhodes
 Tom Coppola - keyboards
 Jon Faddis - trumpet
 Ellen Seeling - trumpet
 Alex Foster - saxophone
 Jean Fineberg - saxophone
 Barry Rodgers - trombone
 Kenny Lehman - woodwinds
 George Young - flute, tenor saxophone
 Vito Rendace - flute, tenor saxophone
 David Friedman - orchestral bells, vibraphones
 Jose Rossy - tubular bells
 Gloria Augustini - harp
 Marianne Carroll (The Chic Strings) - strings
 Karen Karlsrud (The Chic Strings) - strings
 Cheryl Hong (The Chic Strings) - strings
 Karen Milne (The Chic Strings) - strings
 Valerie Haywood (The Chic strings) - strings
 Gene Orloff - concertmaster
 Alfred Brown - strings contractor

Production
 Bernard Edwards - producer for Chic Organization Ltd.
 Nile Rodgers - producer for Chic Organization Ltd.
 Kenny Lehman - co-producer (track A4)
 Jackson Schwartz - engineer
 Jeff Hendrickson - engineer
 Jim Galante - engineer
 Peter Robbins - engineer
 Ray Willard - engineer
 Burt Szerlip - engineer
 Dennis King - mastering
 All songs recorded and mixed at Power Station in New York. Mastered at Atlantic Studios, N.Y.

References

Chic (band) compilation albums
Albums produced by Nile Rodgers
Albums produced by Bernard Edwards
1979 greatest hits albums
Atlantic Records compilation albums